Mzwanele Richman Zito (born 23 November 1988) is a South African rugby union player, currently playing with Carcassonne in the French Pro D2. His regular position is lock.

Career

He joined  and played for them at Under-19 and Under-21 level. Despite being included in their squad for the 2009 Vodacom Cup, he did not make an appearance.

He made his debut against .

After the 2013 Vodacom Cup season, he signed a two-year contract with the  prior to the 2013 Currie Cup First Division.

Griquas

Zito joined Kimberley-based side  for the 2016 season.

Carcassonne

Zito moved to France to join Pro D2 side Carcassonne as a medical joker in August 2017.

References

South African rugby union players
Eastern Province Elephants players
People from Uitenhage
Living people
1988 births
Southern Kings players
SWD Eagles players
Griquas (rugby union) players
US Carcassonne players
Rugby union locks
Rugby union players from the Eastern Cape
Cheetahs (rugby union) players
Free State Cheetahs players